The 2007 Cornell Big Red football team represented Cornell University in the 2007 NCAA Division I FCS football season as  member of the Ivy League. They were led by fourth-year head coach Jim Knowles and played their home games at Schoellkopf Field in Ithaca, New York. Cornell finished the season 5–5 overall and 2–5 in Ivy League play. Cornell averaged 10,871 fans per game.

Schedule

References

Cornell
Cornell Big Red football seasons
Cornell Big Red football